Martin Pistorius (born 31 December 1975) is a South African man who had locked-in syndrome and was unable to move or communicate for 12 years.

When he was 12, he began losing voluntary motor control and eventually fell into a vegetative state for three years. He began regaining consciousness around age 16 and achieved full consciousness by age 19, although he was still completely paralysed with the exception of his eyes. He was unable to communicate with other people until his caregiver Virna van der Walt noticed that he could use his eyes to respond to her words. She sent him to the Centre for Augmentative and Alternative Communication at the University of Pretoria for testing, where they confirmed that he was conscious and aware of his surroundings.

His parents then gave him a speech computer, and he began slowly regaining some upper body functions. In 2008 he met his wife Joanna through his sister Kim, and in 2009 they married. He co-wrote his autobiography Ghost Boy with Megan Lloyd Davies, which was published in 2011.  By that time, Pistorius had regained limited control over his head and arms, but still needed his speech computer to communicate with others. In 2018 it was announced that the couple were expecting a child, and Pistorius was wheelchair-racing.

Pistorius now works as a freelance web designer and developer.

Early life 
During the late 1980s, Pistorius and his parents were living in South Africa, when at the age of 12 he slowly began developing symptoms that included losing the ability to move by himself. Doctors were unable to diagnose the exact ailment and believed it was cryptococcal meningitis and tuberculosis of the brain.

Pistorius eventually fell into a vegetative state that lasted four years, during which time doctors informed his parents that they did not expect Pistorius to re-awaken or survive for much longer. Starting at age 14, Pistorius received part of his daily care via a care home during the day. At night, he was primarily cared for by his father Rodney, who stated that he woke up every two hours to turn his son so that he would not develop bed sores. While unconscious, Pistorius was able to hear and understand conversations his relatives were having by his bedside, although they did not know this. After recovery, he spoke about major world events – such as the death of Princess Diana, Nelson Mandela becoming president, and the September 11 attacks – that happened when he was unable to communicate. He hated the children's television program character Barney – re-runs of which were shown in units where he was recovering – and subsequently tried to think about things that gave him some control over his external reality, such as telling the time by tracking sunlight in a room.

Pistorius believes that he began regaining consciousness around age 16 (around 1992), during which time he was able to sense the people around him but did not immediately recall previous events, something he has described as "a bit like a baby being born". Around age 19, Pistorius regained full consciousness and awareness, but was initially unable to impart this to the people around him. He was capable of making small movements that were not initially detected by his primary caregivers. One day, Virna van der Walt—an aromatherapist and one of Pistorius's day carers—began noticing that Pistorius would react to specific statements and questions she made. Upon her recommendations, Pistorius was sent to the Centre For Augmentative And Alternative Communication at the University of Pretoria around age 25. There, they confirmed that he was aware and could respond to statements. Pistorius's parents gave him a computer with software to communicate with the people around him.

Personal life 
Pistorius met his wife Joanna, a UK resident in 2008 through his sister Kim, who had moved to the United Kingdom for her job. He later moved to the United Kingdom and they were married in 2009. He described the terrifying experience of being aware but paralysed in a short video recording in 2018, when the couple were about to have a child. By that time, while still using a wheelchair, he was racing in it. Their son, Sebastian Albert Pistorius, was born a few months later on 6 December.

Published work 
In 2011, Simon & Schuster published Pistorius's autobiography, Ghost Boy, which he co-wrote with Megan Lloyd Davies. The book met with a favourable response. By 2011, Pistorius had regained some control over his head and arms and could communicate with others via a computer equipped with text-to-speech software.

Media appearances 

Pistorius's story found a considerably larger audience after being featured on the first episode of NPR's podcast Invisibilia, titled "The Secret History of Thoughts".

In 2015, at the TEDx event in Kansas City, Pistorius described how he freed himself from a life locked inside his own body in his talk "How my mind came back to life — and no one knew". He has given other talks. In 2018, he made a video describing his illness and recovery, and the experience of  being fully conscious but unable to communicate.

References

External links 

Entombed in My Own Body for Over 12 Years at BBC World Service (2013)
Man 'locked' in his own brain makes miracle coma recovery | 60 Minutes Australia
Teen Lives 12 Years Of His Life In Locked-In Syndrome Until Nurse Discovers He’s Fully Aware Comedy.com (2020)

South African male writers
Living people
South African autobiographers
1975 births
21st-century South African writers
People from Johannesburg
Naturalised citizens of the United Kingdom
British autobiographers
British male writers
South African emigrants to the United Kingdom
People who awoke from permanent coma like states